Miroslav Vujadinović (Serbian Cyrillic: Мирослав Вујадиновић; born 22 April 1983) is a Montenegrin retired footballer who last played as a goalkeeper for Albanian club Korabi Peshkopi in the Albanian Superliga.

Club career

Vllaznia Shkodër
In May 2012, Vujadinović signed contract extension with Vllaznia Shkodër.

Laçi
On 3 June 2015, Vujadinović agreed a contract extension with Laçi, singing until June 2016.

On 19 July 2016, Vujadinović announced his departure from the club along with several players, ending his Laçi career with 65 appearances in all competitions, winning two trophies.

Korabi Peshkopi
On 27 July 2016, Vujadinović completed a transfer to newly promoted side Korabi Peshkopi, signing a contract for the upcoming season.

International career
Vujadinović has been a former Serbia & Montenegro U21 player, making three competitive appearances between 2005 and 2006.

Honours
Laçi
Albanian Cup: 2014–15
Albanian Supercup: 2015

References

External links

 

1983 births
Living people
Footballers from Podgorica
Association football goalkeepers
Serbia and Montenegro footballers
Serbia and Montenegro under-21 international footballers
Montenegrin footballers
FK Budućnost Podgorica players
KF Vllaznia Shkodër players
KF Laçi players
KF Korabi Peshkopi players
First League of Serbia and Montenegro players
Montenegrin First League players
Kategoria Superiore players
Montenegrin expatriate footballers
Expatriate footballers in Albania
Montenegrin expatriate sportspeople in Albania